Szemely is a village in Baranya county, Hungary. It is south-east of the city of Pécs and the town of Kozármisleny

External links 
 Official Website
 Street map

Populated places in Baranya County